Pi Sigma Gamma was a social sorority which existed from 1919 to 1932. It was a member of the National Panhellenic Conference.

History
Pi Sigma Gamma was founded on November 23, 1919 by two University of California at Berkeley students, Alice H. Cassidy and Kathleen D. Coghlan.

The UCLA chapter closed in 1930. The remaining chapters affiliated with Beta Sigma Omicron in 1932. With the merger, Beta Sigma Omicron gained a chapter (Alpha Omega) at Washington and a chapter at Hunter (Beta Alpha), while California merged with the Alpha Iota chapter of Beta Sigma Omicron chapter on that campus.

Total membership was 439.

Chapters
The following chapters were chartered by 1930:

Symbols
National conventions were held throughout the 1920s. The sorority had several publications: a song book, a Pledge Manual, a Handbook for Pledges. Its magazine was Triple Wing

the coat-of-arms was "A group of emblems within a shield outline, three book, lamp, and crossed swords are employed in the device."

Colors of the sorority were white, royal blue, golden yellow, and rose.

References

Defunct former members of the National Panhellenic Conference
1919 establishments in California
Fraternities and sororities in the United States
Student organizations established in 1919